was a Japanese archaeologist.

Biography
He was an expert in the Neolithic and early period of the Middle East and has conducted much research at sites in countries like Syria and Iran. Iwasaki was a professor at the University of Tsukuba. Formally, from 1990, in coordination with the university, he conducted extensive field work in the Rouj Basin of northwest Syria.

Along with Akira Tsuneki, he co-wrote Archaeology of the Rouj Basin. He was involved with the Tokyo Women's College of Home Economics, and directed the  Matsudo City Museum from 1993 to 2006, and The Ancient Orient Museum, Tokyo from 2006 to 2010. He was a member of the Japan Science Council. He died on February 4, 2018, at the age of 89.

Links
CiNii

References

1929 births
2018 deaths
Japanese archaeologists
Japanese people from Manchukuo
Academic staff of the University of Tsukuba